Dear John is an American sitcom that aired on NBC. It was based on the 1986–87 British sitcom of the same name that aired on the BBC. It ran for four seasons from 1988 to 1992, and aired a total of 85 episodes.

Series overview

Episodes

Season 1 (1988–89)

Season 2 (1989–90)

Season 3 (1990–91)

Season 4 (1991–92)

References

External links
 
 

Lists of American sitcom episodes